Katrina Mitten (born 1962, Huntington, Indiana) is a Native American artist. She is enrolled in the Miami Tribe of Oklahoma.

Mitten is beadwork artist, whose embroidery style of beadwork has earned her numerous awards and has been featured in major metropolitan museums.

Biography
Mitten is a descendant of one of the five Miami families who were allowed to stay after the establishment of the Indian Removal Act by Andrew Jackson. This act allowed him to relocate access to relocate Native people from their ancestral homelands. Those who were not relocated were encouraged to assimilate into Westernized civilization. Instead, they tried to pass on as much of their culture as possible

At the age of twelve, Mitten learned beading from her grandmother Josephine. Josephine influenced a large portion of Mitten's works, including her 1950s handbag, which she has stated represents her family heritage. Mitten made this handbag collaborating with her granddaughter Saiyer Miller and teaching her using the same methods as her grandmother.

Mitten also learned more about her tribe by visiting museums and studying her families' heirlooms. She is active on the powwow circuit.

She has created utilitarian works, such as The Cradle Board, as well as necklaces, bracelets, and beaded handbags. Other influences in her art include the geometric designs found in ribbonwork and the floral patterns depicted throughout the Great Lakes tribal beadwork. She incorporates personal and family stories into her art pieces and uses her art as a means of story telling.

In 2016 Mitten collaborated with Native American artists Katy Strass and Angela Ellsworth to create a painting of the states on a fiberglass statue of a bison.

Two of her pieces, MMIW (Missing and Murdered Indigenous Women) and Ten Original Clans of the Myaamia, were acquired by the Smithsonian American Art Museum as part of the Renwick Gallery's 50th Anniversary Campaign.

Select artworks
 Cradle Board
 "I have been waiting for you" outfit
 1950's Handbag
 1940s-styled bag

Exhibitions
 Native Art Market at the National Museum of the American Indian, Washington, D.C. (2014)
 Myaamia Heritage Museum & Archive (2018)
 Santa Fe Indian Market

Collections 
Mitten's artwork is held in the permanent collections of:
 Eiteljorg Museum of American Indians and Western Art 
 Smithsonian's National Museum of the American Indian
 Smithsonian American Art Museum

References

External links 
 Native Daughter: Katrina Mitten video from Journey Indiana 

Artists from Indiana
Miami people
Native American artists
1962 births
Living people
Native American women artists
20th-century American artists
20th-century American women artists
21st-century American artists
21st-century American women artists
20th-century Native Americans
21st-century Native Americans
20th-century Native American women
21st-century Native American women
Native American people from Indiana
Native American bead artists
Women beadworkers